Orbital angular momentum may refer to:

 One of three main quantum angular momentum operators
 Orbital angular momentum of light, a property of electromagnetic waves
 Orbital angular momentum of free electrons, a property of free electrons
 Orbital angular momentum of planets and satellites relative to the object they orbit